Senator Hays may refer to:

Charles Hays (1834–1879), Alabama State Senate
Samuel Hays (Pennsylvania politician) (1783–1868), Pennsylvania State Senate
Wayne Hays (1911–1989), Ohio State Senate

See also
Senator Hay (disambiguation)
Senator Hayes (disambiguation)